Hitrino Municipality is a municipality (obshtina) in Shumen Province, Northeastern Bulgaria, located in the Ludogorie geographical region, part of the Danubian Plain. It is named after its administrative centre - the village of Hitrino.

Settlements 

Hitrino Municipality includes the following 23 places, all of them are villages:

Demography 
The following table shows the change of the population during the last four decades.

Ethnic composition
According to the 2011 census, among those who answered the optional question on ethnic identification, the ethnic composition of the municipality was the following:

Religious composition

See also
Provinces of Bulgaria
Municipalities of Bulgaria
List of cities and towns in Bulgaria

References

External links
 Official website 

Municipalities in Shumen Province